The Temple of Athena is the Parthenon on the Athenian Acropolis in Greece.

Temple of Athena may also refer to:

 Temple of Athena (Paestum)
 Temple of Athena (Syracuse)
 Temple of Athena Alea, at Tegea, Greece
 Temple of Athena Lindia, on Rhodos, Greece
 Temple of Athena Nike, also on the Athenian Acropolis

See also

 Old Temple of Athena, which preceded the Parthenon on the Athenian Acropolis
 Athena (disambiguation)